Trial & Error is an American sitcom television series created by Jeff Astrof and Matt Miller for NBC and produced by Warner Bros. Television. It stars Nicholas D'Agosto, Jayma Mays, Steven Boyer, and Sherri Shepherd. The series, which spoofs documentaries and reality legal shows, follows New York City lawyer Josh Segal (D'Agosto) and his eccentric local associates (Boyer and Shepherd) as they represent accused local citizens in the fictional small town of East Peck, South Carolina. Recurring guests were Krysta Rodriguez and John Lithgow in season 1, and Kristin Chenoweth and Amanda Payton in season 2.

The first season premiered on March 14, 2017. On May 20, 2017, NBC renewed the series for a 10-episode second season. Both seasons have received positive critical reception. The series was officially cancelled on January 16, 2019, after NBC decided against renewing it for a third season in August 2018 and Warner Bros. failed to find a new broadcaster.

Premise
The series is a comedic legal mockumentary about a young bright-eyed New York lawyer, Josh Segal, who settles in the fictional, small Southern town of East Peck, South Carolina with an oddball defense team that solves cases from behind a taxidermy shop. In the first season, they defend a compulsively eccentric poetry professor, Larry Henderson who is accused of the bizarre murder of his beloved wife. The case becomes challenging because his client is always making himself look guilty. The second season is subtitled "Lady Killer" and centers on the defense of Lavinia Peck-Foster, the town's beloved debutante who has been accused of murdering her husband. The prosecutor on each case is assistant DA Carol Anne Keane, a young lawyer determined to use the cases to raise her profile, and with whom Josh has sporadic sexual encounters.

Cast and characters

Main

 Nicholas D'Agosto as Josh Segal, a defense lawyer from New York who finds his first experience of murder trials in East Peck, South Carolina. He has to put up with the antics of his team members much to his chagrin. He becomes involved in a love triangle between Carol Anne and Nina during Season 2.
 Jayma Mays as Carol Anne Keane, Assistant District Attorney of East Peck and Josh's rival as well as love interest. She becomes pregnant in Season 2, expecting a baby by an unknown father.
 Steven Boyer as Dwayne Reed, Josh's lead investigator and a former police officer in East Peck. He rejoins the police force in Season 2, while simultaneously working for the defense team.
 Sherri Shepherd as Anne Flatch, Josh's assistant/head researcher who has rare and bizarre disorders.
 Krysta Rodriguez as Summer Henderson (season 1), the daughter of Larry Henderson who later joins Josh's team. Like Josh, she is serious and the least nonsensical of the group.
 John Lithgow as Larry Henderson (season 1), a poetry professor and the suspect on trial for the murder of his wife.
 Amanda Payton as Nina Rudolph (season 2), a stylish podcast host who moves to East Peck from New York to follow the trial of Lavinia Peck Foster and ends up tangled in a love triangle.
 Kristin Chenoweth as Lavinia Peck-Foster (season 2), an eccentric heiress of East Peck. She hires Josh and his associates after finding her husband stuffed in a suitcase in the back of her car.

Recurring
 Bob Gunton as Jeremiah Jefferson Davis, a tobacco businessman, Margaret's brother, and hence Larry's brother-in-law.
 Cristine Rose as Josie Jefferson Davis, the quiet, alcoholic wife of Jeremiah and the sister-in-law of Larry and Margaret Henderson.
 Angel Parker as Heidi Baker, a local TV journalist who reports on the investigation of Larry Henderson.
 Dave Allen as Dave, a taxidermist who owns a shop next to Josh's office.
 Kevin Daniels as Alfonzo Prefontaine, Larry's fitness trainer and lover.
 Patricia Belcher as E. Horsedich (pronounced Hi-sen-dich, with a soft "c" on the last syllable), the judge who presides over the case of People v. Larry Henderson.
 Kevin Durand as Rutger Hiss, a local police officer who leads the investigation of Larry Henderson. Despite his comatose state, he is elected mayor of East Peck in Season 2.
 Julie Hagerty as Madame Rhonda, a pet psychic who later becomes Juror 9 in the trial of People v. Larry Henderson.
 Michael Hitchcock as Jesse Ray Beaumont (season 2), a horologist that was tried and convicted for the murder of Lavinia's brother Chet nine years ago.
 Joel McCrary as Alexander Kamiltow (season 2), the judge for Lavinia's trial. Unlike Horsedich, his name is pronounced the way it is spelled. After trying to stop a chaotic outburst in Jesse Ray Beaumont's trial, he lost his voice, and now speaks in unintelligible gibberish, yet everyone but Josh understands him perfectly.
 Shannon Chan-Kent as Clem Tuckett (season 2), an anchorwoman covering the investigation of Lavinia Peck-Foster.
 Serge Houde as Milton The Houseboy (season 2), Lavinia's loyal manservant and long-suffering confidante.
 Jaleel White as Atticus Ditto, Jr. (season 2), the prosecutor who took over Beaumont's first Trial when Carol Anne was removed, and Carol Anne's rival for the D.A. election.
 Andy Thompson as Dr Rock n' Law (season 2), Beaumont's defense attorney in his original trial, and aspiring rock musician.

Guest
 Andrew Daly as Thom Hinkle, a DNA expert who suffers from a bizarre type of OCD. It is revealed in season 2 that he is now decommissioned because of his bizarre OCD.
 Marla Gibbs as Mrs. Kratt, Larry's antipathetic neighbor.
 Fred Melamed as Howard Mankiewicz, a founding partner of the firm where Josh works.
 Andie MacDowell as Margaret Henderson, Larry's deceased wife whose murder becomes the subject of the first season of the mockumentary.
 Adam Campbell as Dr. Shinewell, veterinarian/OBGYN for East Peck

Episodes

Season 1 (2017)

Season 2: Lady, Killer (2018)

Production

Development
In August 2015, it was announced that NBC had given the production, then titled The Trial, a put pilot commitment. The episode was set to be written and executive produced by Jeff Astrof and Matt Miller, from Warner Bros. Television. The following January, NBC gave the production an official pilot order, with Jeffrey Blitz set to direct the pilot episode. In May 2016, the production received a series order from NBC, now titled Trial & Error, with Barge Productions and Good Session Productions also serving as production companies. The first season premiered on March 14, 2017.

On May 20, 2017, Trial & Error was renewed for a second season consisting of ten episodes. The season features the subtitle Lady, Killer, and premiered on July 19, 2018. On August 7, 2018, NBC's option to renew the series for a potential third season had expired, with the rights reverting to Warner Bros. Television. Although the main cast's contracts had yet to expire, the series was being shopped around to other networks and streaming services. The series was officially cancelled on January 16, 2019 after Warner Bros. failed to find a new broadcaster for the series. Warner Bros. remained "open to continuing the series should an opportunity arise in the future."

Casting
In February 2016, it was announced that Steven Boyer, John Lithgow, Sherri Shepherd, Jayma Mays, Nicholas D'Agosto, and Krysta Rodriguez had joined the main cast of the pilot. The main cast all returned for the second season, except Lithgow, who only had a single season commitment to the series, and Rodriguez. NBC chairman Bob Greenblatt felt there was the potential for Lithgow to appear in a couple episodes of the second season, though his eventual appearances were by way of archived footage from the first season. Kristin Chenoweth was cast in February 2018 as the new character accused of murder and set to stand trial. Amanda Payton also joins the cast for the second season as the host of a podcast covering the new trial.

Filming
The second season filmed from March 19 to May 22, 2018, in Vancouver, after the first season was filmed in Burbank, California.

Broadcast
Internationally, the series was acquired in Australia by the Seven Network where it premiered on April 30, 2017, and in New Zealand by TVNZ.

Reception

Critical response
On Rotten Tomatoes, the first season has an approval rating of 86% based on 35 reviews, with an average rating of 6.85/10. The site's critical consensus reads, "Trial & Error hilariously parodies the true-crime genre with consistent laughs, irreverently funny 'stupid humor,' and animated characters who populate the show's dependably entertaining narratives." On Metacritic, the first season has a score of 67 out of 100, based on 29 critics, indicating "generally favorable reviews".

On Rotten Tomatoes, the second season has an approval rating of 91% based on 11 reviews, with an average rating of 7.78/10. The sites critical consensus reads, "As a quirky courtroom satire Trial & Error continues to delight, but its best motion may be allowing the singular Kristin Chenoweth to shine in all of her whimsically manic glory as the titular Lady, Killer". On Metacritic, the second season has a score of 76 out of 100, based on 11 critics, indicating "generally favorable reviews".

Ratings

Season 1 (2017)

Season 2 (2018)

Accolades

References

External links
 
 

2010s American mockumentary television series
2010s American surreal comedy television series
2010s American single-camera sitcoms
2017 American television series debuts
2018 American television series endings
2010s American legal television series
English-language television shows
NBC original programming
Television series by Warner Bros. Television Studios
Television shows set in South Carolina